Taine Pechet is a thoracic surgeon and Chief of Surgery at the University of Pennsylvania's Presbyterian Medical Center. Pechet has made substantial contributions to the field of thoracic surgery. He resides in Philadelphia, Pennsylvania.

Education
 Harvard Medical School, Class of 1992
 Brigham and Women's Hospital, Residency, General Surgery, 1992–1999
 Washington University School of Medicine, Fellowship, Thoracic Surgery, 1999–2001

Areas of specialization
Pechet specializes in lung cancer, lung surgery, video assisted thoracic surgery (vats), palliative care.

Board certifications
Pechet is board certified in the following areas:
 Surgery, 2000
 Thoracic and Cardiac Surgery, 2002

Awards
Pechet was recognized:
 In Philadelphia Magazine's 2011-2016 Top Docs issues
 By America's Top Doctors (2013, 2014)

Other appointments
Pechet is currently Chief of Surgery at Penn Presbyterian Medical Center. He sees patients there and at Penn Medicine Cherry Hill, in Cherry Hill NJ.

References 

Living people
American thoracic surgeons
Harvard Medical School alumni
University of Pennsylvania faculty
Year of birth missing (living people)
Washington University in St. Louis fellows